Kameron Shaun Fox (born 16 November 1977, in Bermuda) is a Bermudian cricketer. He is a right-handed batsman and a left-arm spin bowler. To date, he has played four List A matches for Bermuda as part of the 1996 Red Stripe Bowl, also representing his country in the 1997 ICC Trophy.

References

External links
Cricket Archive profile
Cricinfo profile

1977 births
Living people
Bermudian cricketers